The Alex and Mary Alice Johnson House, is a house in Grantsville, Utah, United States. It was listed on the National Register of Historic Places in 1995.

Description
The house, located at 5 West Main Street, is a Queen Anne style house that was built in 1900. It was built by Charles Zaphaniah Shaffer, a carpenter. It served as a hotel or lodging house during the 1930s and 1940s.  As Lone Pine Tourist Home it was often well-occupied, being only  from Lincoln Highway.

According to its NRHP nomination, it is "an excellent example of the Victorian Queen Anne style" and "is one of the most distinctive architectural landmarks of Grantsville."  As of 1995, the house was very well-preserved.

See also

 National Register of Historic Places listings in Tooele County, Utah

References

External links

Houses on the National Register of Historic Places in Utah
Queen Anne architecture in Utah
Houses completed in 1900
Houses in Tooele County, Utah
Bed and breakfasts in Utah
National Register of Historic Places in Tooele County, Utah